Urbancic is a surname. Notable people with the surname include:

Frank C. Urbancic Jr. (1951–2016), American diplomat
Ivo Urbančič (1930–2016), Slovenian philosopher
Jošt Urbančič (2001–), Slovenian footballer
Nataša Urbančič (1945–2011), Slovenian javelin thrower
Victor Urbancic (1903–1958), Austrian composer and conductor